Short Hills Provincial Park is a provincial park located in the centre of the Niagara Peninsula, bordering the city of St. Catharines and the town of Pelham in the Niagara Region in southern Ontario, Canada. It also borders the new vineyard sub-appellation called the Short Hills Bench.

Located on the southern edge of the Niagara Escarpment, the park is a jumble of small but steep hills ("short hills") and valleys created by the last ice age. The effect was only compounded when the Twelve Mile Creek cut through the sedimentary deposits and glacial till.

Wildlife inhabiting the park include white-tailed deer, coyote, and meadow vole. Being at the north end of the Carolinian zone, many plants grow here that do not grow or are rarely found in other parts of Canada, including pawpaw, sweet chestnut and tulip-tree.

The only park of its scale in Niagara, Short Hills Provincial Park is a prime destination for residents of nearby cities, especially St. Catharines and Niagara Falls. Popular activities include hiking, horseback riding, fishing and mountain biking.

The park contains six-side trails including the Bruce Trail and several waterfalls, it  has a nice mix of both dense forests and open meadows, with meandering creeks and gentle hills that offer good hiking conditions.

References

Further reading

External links
 
 Friends of Short Hills Park
 Short Hills Provincial Park

Provincial parks of Ontario
Niagara Escarpment
Temperate broadleaf and mixed forests in Canada
Protected areas of the Regional Municipality of Niagara
Forests of Ontario
Protected areas established in 1985
1985 establishments in Ontario
St. Catharines